Cooksonia neavei, or Neave's tiger mimic, is a butterfly in the family Lycaenidae. The species was first described by Hamilton Herbert Druce in 1912. It is found in Tanzania, Zambia and Zimbabwe. The habitat consists of Brachystegia woodland.

Adults resemble dead leaves. They are on wing from late October to mid-November.

The larvae feed on foliose lichens, probably Parmelia species that grow on tree trunks, as is the case with C. aliciae in Malawi.

Subspecies
Cooksonia neavei neavei (southern Tanzania)
Cooksonia neavei rhodesiae Pinhey, 1962 (north-eastern Zimbabwe, Zambia)

References

Seitz, A. Die Gross-Schmetterlinge der Erde 13: Die Afrikanischen Tagfalter. Plate XIII 63 a

Butterflies described in 1912
Poritiinae
Taxa named by Hamilton Herbert Druce